A piñata is a brightly colored papier-mâché, cardboard, or clay container, originating from Mexico.

Piñata may also refer to:

Film and television
 Piñata (film), a 2005 Australian computer-animated short film
 Piñata: Survival Island, or Demon Island, a 2002 horror film
 "Piñata" (Better Call Saul), a 2018 TV episode

Music
 Piñata (Freddie Gibbs and Madlib album), 2014
 Piñata (Mexican Institute of Sound album), 2007
 "Piñata", a song by Chevelle from Hats Off to the Bull, 2011

Other uses
 Piñata Books, an imprint of Arte Público Press
 Piñata cookie, a sugar cookie
 , the privatization of public and seized goods for Sandinista officials.